The New Orleans Gold, stylized as NOLA Gold, is a professional rugby union team based in New Orleans. The team was founded in 2017 and competes in Major League Rugby. Since January 2020, French rugby power ASM Clermont Auvergne has owned a minority stake in the team.

Home field

Gold Mine on Airline
The team plays at the Gold Mine on Airline, formerly known as the Shrine on Airline and Zephyr Field, in Metairie, Louisiana, on the East Bank of the New Orleans metropolitan area.

Joe Zimmerman Stadium
For the first two seasons of Major League Rugby in 2018 and 2019, the team played at Joe Zimmerman Stadium at Archbishop Shaw High School under the branding of Gold Stadium. The natural turf field with grandstand seating for up to 3,000 people is located on the West Bank at Marrero, Louisiana.

Broadcasts
Home games are shown on Cox Sports Television. Ian McNulty and Geoffrey Ormsby are the on air talent.

Sponsorship
For the 2022 season, NOLA Gold partnered with local Louisiana, Port Orleans Brewing Company to make "GOLDen Ale". These 16-ounce cans will be available for purchase in the brewery's tap room and on tap at the start of the season. It will also be sold throughout the season in the team's home stadium, the Shrine on Airline.

Players and personnel

Current squad

The New Orleans Gold squad for the 2023 Major League Rugby season is:

 Senior 15s internationally capped players are listed in bold.
 MLR teams are allowed to field up to ten overseas players per match.

Head coaches
 Nate Osborne (2018–2021)
  Kane Thompson (2022–)

Assistant coaches
  Kane Thompson, forwards and defense (2019–2021)
 Taylor Howden (2022)
 Carlos Spencer (2022)

Captains
Taylor Howden (2018)
Eric Howard (2019–2020)
Kyle Baillie (2021)
Cam Dolan (2022–)

Records

Season standings

2018 season

° = Exhibition game

2019 season

Exhibitions

Regular season

2020 season

On March 12, 2020, MLR announced the season would go on hiatus immediately for 30 days due to fears surrounding the COVID-19 pandemic. One week later (March 19), MLR announced that it had canceled the rest of the 2020 season.

Regular season

2021 season

Regular season

2022 season

Regular season

Notes

References

External links
 

 
Major League Rugby teams
Rugby union teams in Louisiana
Sports teams in New Orleans
Rugby clubs established in 2017
2017 establishments in Louisiana